Rail transport in Israel includes heavy rail (inter-city, commuter, and freight rail) as well as light rail. All of the lines are standard gauge and as of 2023 approximately one-fifth of the heavy rail network is electrified, with additional electrification work underway. A government owned rail company, Israel Railways, manages the entire heavy rail network. Most of the network is located on the densely populated coastal plain.

Some of the rail routes in Israel date back to before the establishment of the state – to the days of the British Mandate for Palestine and earlier. Rail infrastructure was considered less important than road infrastructure during the state's early years, and except for the construction of the coastal railway in the early 1950s, the network saw little investment until the late 1980s. In 1993, a rail connection was opened between the coastal railway from the north and southern lines (the railway to Jerusalem and railway to Beersheba) through Tel Aviv. Previously the only connection between northern railways and southern railways bypassed the Tel Aviv region – Israel's population and commercial center. The linking of the nationwide rail network through the heart of Tel Aviv was a major factor in facilitating further expansion in the overall network during the 1990s and 2000s and as a result of the heavy infrastructure investments passenger traffic rose significantly, from about 2.5 million per year in 1990 to about 67 million in 2018.

Israel is a member of the International Union of Railways and its UIC country code is 95. Currently, the country does not have railway links to adjacent countries, but one such link is planned with Jordan. Further links existed with Egypt, Lebanon and Syria in earlier years. Unlike road vehicles and street trams, trains in Israel run on the left hand tracks.

In addition to heavy rail, several urban transport rail lines operate or are under construction in Israel. These include a short funicular underground railway in Haifa which opened in 1959 (Carmelit) and a light rail line in Jerusalem which began operating in 2011. As of 2020, several lines are under construction or planned in the Tel Aviv area.

History

Ottoman Empire
Rail infrastructure in what is now Israel was first envisioned and realized during the Ottoman period. Sir Moses Montefiore, in 1839, was an early proponent of trains in the land of Israel. However, the first railroad in Eretz Yisrael, was the Jaffa-Jerusalem railway, which opened on September 26, 1892. A trip along the line took 3 hours and 30 minutes. The line was initiated by the Jewish entrepreneur Joseph Navon and built by the French at meter gauge. The second line in what is now Israel was the Jezreel Valley railway from Haifa to Beit She’an, which had been built in 1904 as part of the Haifa-Daraa branch, a 1905-built feeder line of the Hejaz Railway which ran from Medina to Damascus. At the time, the Ottoman Empire ruled the Levant, but was a declining power and would succumb in World War I. During the Ottoman era, the network grew: Nablus, Kalkiliya, and Beersheba all gained train stations. The First World War brought yet another rail line: the Ottomans, with German assistance, laid tracks from Beersheba to Kadesh Barnea on the Sinai Peninsula. (This line ran through trains from Afula through Tulkarm.) This resulted in the construction of the eastern and southern railways.

Mideastern regional rail travel: the British Mandate

The British invaded the Levant, dismantled the Kadesh Barnea line, and built a new line from Beersheba to Gaza, allowing a connection with their own line from Egypt, running through Lod to Haifa. In 1920 a new company, called Palestine Railways was established, which took over the responsibility of running the country's rail network. During the British Mandate, rail travel increased considerably, with a line being built between Petach Tikva and Rosh HaAyin, and Lydda (which was near the main airport in the area) becoming a major hub during WWII. Also during the war, in 1942, the British opened a route running from Haifa to Beirut and Tripoli. Shortly after the war expired, the Rosh HaNikra tunnel was dug, allowing train travel from Lebanon and points north (and west) to Palestine and Egypt.

Starting in 1917–18, the British converted the Ottoman 1050 mm gauge southern, eastern and Jerusalem railways to standard gauge, though not the Jezreel Valley railway and some of its branches which remained narrow gauge and thus incompatible with the rest of the railways in Palestine. The British also extended some of the existing railways and connected them with adjacent countries and built  gauge lines in Jaffa and Jerusalem. After the First World War ended, the British nationalized all railways in the Palestine mandate and created the Palestine Railways company to manage operations.

Israel

When Israel gained independence in 1948, the state created Israel Railways as a successor to the British company. During the 1947–1949 Palestine war, much damage was done to the railways in the country, especially the Jezreel Valley railway, which was not rebuilt due to financial constraints and its incompatibility with the rest of the rail network.

In the first years of Israeli independence, rail passenger traffic grew rapidly, reaching about 4.5 million passengers per annum during the early to mid-1960s, at which point traffic began to slacken due to improvements in the road infrastructure, increases in the automobile ownership rate, lack of investment in the rail network, and a continued favoring of public transportation using buses over trains. This trend reached a low point of about 2.5 million passengers in 1990, which on a per-capita basis represented about a 75% decrease from the heyday of the 1960s. Then in the 1990s, a wave of railway infrastructure development began, leading to a resurgence of the railways' importance within the country's transportation system.

Rail infrastructure

Heavy rail

The majority of the network has been double tracked, the result of extensive works which have been ongoing since around 1990 to increase capacity throughout the network.

The rail network includes the coastal railway line spanning from Nahariya in the north to Tel Aviv in the south, through Acre, Haifa (with a spur to eastern Haifa), Netanya and other cities. A small commuter line goes from Kfar Saba in the north to Tel Aviv, and connects to a freight-only line from Rosh HaAyin to Lod, part of the partially defunct Eastern railway. Plans exist to rebuild the eastern railway from Hadera to Rosh HaAyin, with a spur to Afula.

Six lines go south from Tel Aviv, including two lines to Rishon LeZion, one of which continues to Yavne with a section from Yavne to Ashdod currently under construction; a line to Ashkelon through Lod and Rehovot with a spur to the Port of Ashdod; a line to Modi'in through Ben Gurion International Airport; a line to Jerusalem, which is part of the historical Jaffa–Jerusalem railway; and the railway to Beersheba, with branches to Ramat Hovav and the Israel Chemicals factories through Dimona. The railway to Beersheba is also connected to the line to Ashkelon through the Heletz railway.

In the early 2000s, the Israeli government embarked on a major project to upgrade the existing rail network and build a number of entirely new lines. This includes rebuilding the railways to Kfar Saba and Beersheba, while converting them to double-track and constructing dozens of grade separations between road and rail. Then in the 2010s decade, rebuilding the Jezreel Valley railway and creating new lines: the Railway to Karmiel, the High-speed railway to Jerusalem, a line from Ashkelon to Beersheba through Sderot, Netivot and Ofakim, and a railway as part of the Route 531 project. Some of these projects were initiated in the 2000s but were eventually frozen, with work on some resuming in 2009–2010, when they were included in a major government plan to connect almost all cities in Israel to the rail network.

Network expansion
Several major railway projects are expected to be carried out starting in the early 2020s. The first involves relieving the national rail network bottleneck caused by insufficient capacity in the Ayalon section of the Coastal Railway through the addition of a fourth railroad track between Tel Aviv Central and Tel Aviv HaHagana. The overall project also includes adding two additional tracks to the Tel Aviv–Lod railway. Another major project that began construction is the Rishon LeZion–Modi'in railway, linking Rishon LeZion and Modi'in via Highway 431, with a connection to the new Tel Aviv–Jerusalem railway. This will allow direct train travel between Jerusalem and Modi'in and the southern Gush Dan suburbs. The third major project expected to commence by 2020 is the rebuilding of the long-defunct Kfar Sava–Hadera section of the  Eastern railway, which will create a new north-south railway corridor in central Israel. The project also includes upgrading the existing Eastern railway section between Rosh Ha’ayin and Lod.

Longer-term plans plan call for a railway to Eilat (Med-Red), a line to Arad through Nevatim and Kseifa, a line to Nazareth and continuing the Karmiel and Jezreel Valley lines to Kiryat Shmona, Safed and Tiberias.

Electrification
In the spring of 2010, the government of Israel voted to appropriate the sum of NIS 11.2 billion out of a total NIS 17.2 billion (appx. US $4.5 billion) necessary to implement the first phase of Israel Railways' electrification programme.  This phase includes electrifying 420 km of railways using 25 kV 50 Hz AC, the construction of 14 transformer stations, the purchase of electric rolling stock, and upgrades to maintenance facilities as well as to signalling and control systems (including the installation of ETCS Level 2 signaling throughout the network). Preliminary design for the electrification effort was conducted by Tedem Civil Engineering in the early 2000s, while Yanai Electrical Engineering was selected by Israel Railways in 2011 to carry out the detailed design of the system. In December 2015 Israel Railways announced that the Spanish engineering firm SEMI (Sociedad Española de Montajes Industriales) won the tender for constructing the electrification infrastructure.

, there are 4 electrified lines
 Tel Aviv–Jerusalem railway.
 Herzliya–Ashkelon
 Jerusalem–Modi'in
 Ashkelon/Rehovot–Netanya/Binyamina

Technical characteristics
The following standards are employed throughout the mainline heavy rail network in Israel:
Rail gauge: standard gauge (1435mm)
Max speed: 160 km/h
Rail type: UIC60 or UIC54 (60 kg/m or 54 kg/m), continuously welded
Loading gauge: UIC GC
Minimum curve radius: 190m (main lines)
Common distance between track centers of multi-tracked railways: 4.7m
Train protection system: PZB/Indusi
Interlocking: Electronic (Thales LockTrac 6111/ESTW L90)
National traffic control system: Thales NetTrac 6613 ARAMIS
Railway coupling: Buffers and chain (locomotive drawn), Scharfenberg (multiple unit trainsets)
Maximum gradient: 29‰
Max rolling stock axle load: 22.5 metric ton per axle
Minimum number of sleepers per kilometer: 1667 (mostly B70 prestressed concrete monoblock)
Passenger platform minimum length: 300 m (some older stations use the previous standard of 250 m; new and upgraded stations: 350 m)
Electrification: Single-phase 25 kV 50 Hz AC OCS
Train control system: ERTMS (GSM-R/ETCS L2) – will replace Indusi

Sandwich stations
An interesting character of the current Israeli railway network is that many of the new tracks and railway stations are located in the median strip of the Israeli highway system. The first station such located was the Tel Aviv Savidor Central railway station, whose original platforms directly north of the station hall were closed and replaced with new platforms in the median strip of the Ayalon Freeway in 1988; the first station purpose-built in this arrangement was the Tel Aviv HaShalom railway station, a kilometer south of Savidor Central.

Metro/Light rail

The only light rail line in Israel is the Jerusalem Light Rail, opened in 2011. An extension of the western side to Hadassah Ein Kerem and the eastern side to Neve Ya'akov is under construction and is due to open in 2023. The Green Line is under construction (planned to open in 2025).

The first (red) line will connect Petah Tikva in the northeast to Bat Yam in the southwest, with a main 12km underground section (covering Bnei Brak, Ramat Gan and Tel Aviv). Opening date is set to November 2022. The Green Line will connect Holon in the south with an extension to Rishon LeZion, and the western part of Herzelia to the north with an extension to the northern parts of Tel Aviv, including the Tel Aviv University. The Purple Line line will start at Tel Aviv Savidor Central railway station, passing through the city and continuing east to Yehud with an extension to Kiryat Ono and Bar Ilan University. Both the Green Line and the Purple Line are under construction and the estimated opening year is 2027/2028.

An extensive 3-line metro system in Tel Aviv is in the final approval stages. Currently construction is scheduled to start in 2025 and operation of the first sections is scheduled for 2032.

Tenders have been issued for the Haifa–Nazareth railway, a tram-train line linking Haifa and Nazareth.

An underground funicular rail line, called Carmelit, was opened in Haifa in 1959.

Passenger traffic

Following the low point of 2.5 million passengers in 1990, the extensive investments in the national heavy rail infrastructure beginning in the early to mid-1990s made train travel more appealing, especially given the ever-increasing road congestion, and consequently passenger rail use began rising rapidly—by a factor of about fivefold over any given ten-year span during the 1990s and 2000s. Consequently, in the 25-year span between 1990 and 2015, heavy rail passenger traffic grew over 20-times. Moreover, with several large-scale railway infrastructure projects still underway and more planned in the future, the growth in passenger numbers is expected to continue.

Statistics

Ridership
The following table includes ridership statistics for heavy rail only.

Passenger kilometres
The following table contains the total travelled distances for all passengers per annum.

Passenger stations

Freight
According to official statistics, Israel Railways transported approximately seven million tons of freight in 2010. Minerals and chemicals from the Dead Sea area, such as phosphates, potash and sulphur, made up more than half of this amount. As of 2011, the share of total domestic freight transported by rail is approximately 8%. The government of Israel, believing that freight rail transport in the country is underutilized, particularly with respect to container transport, has set a goal of doubling the amount of freight transported by rail by the middle of the 2010s decade and tripling it by the end of the decade. Its plan calls for an upgrade of the freight transport infrastructure, including more freight terminals, new or renewed sidings to factories and other customers, and the purchase of additional freight locomotives and freight cars. From an administrative perspective, Israel Railways' freight division will be spun off into a separate subsidiary, which will be 51% privately owned by a strategic partner committed to maximizing the railway's freight transport potential. The new subsidiary will be allowed to partner directly with other transport providers in the private sector in order to offer customers more cost-effective, flexible and complete transport and logistical solutions than those currently offered by Israel Railways.

Rail links to adjacent countries
Originally part of the Palestine Railway, a line linked East Qantara north of the Suez Canal in Egypt, skirting the Mediterranean northward to the port of Tripoli, Lebanon. In 1912, the French built an extension of the Baghdad Railway south from Aleppo, Syria, to connect at Tripoli, Lebanon. Expanded during World War II by both Australian and later New Zealand engineers, the effective footprint extended as far as Damascus.

For a railway both created and affected by the logistical need of military engineers supporting various war efforts, on the establishment of the State of Israel in 1948 and the outbreak of hostilities during the 1947–1949 Palestine war, those connections were severed and have yet to be restored.

Israeli forces bombed the rail bridge to Lebanon, and the remnants of this line can be seen at Rosh HaNikra grottoes, where a virtual "train ride to peace" movie is shown inside the sealed tunnel that used to go into Lebanon. The tracks used to continue from Rosh HaNikra to Nahariya (the current northern end of the line) making it possible for one to travel from Lebanon all the way to Tel Aviv, Cairo, and beyond. However, current Israel Railways proposals for a link with Lebanon are planned to branch off the Haifa-Karmiel railway in Ahihud. Northerly, there was a route to Syria and connection via Chemins de Fer Syriens to Damascus.

Railway links with adjacent countries
 Lebanon – defunct
 Syria – defunct (narrow gauge)
 Jordan – proposed
 Egypt – defunct

Proposed rail lines to the PA
Talks between Israel and the Palestinian Authority in 2004 have raised the possibility of reviving the old line from the Gaza Strip to Tulkarem and/or building a new line from Gaza to Tarkumia (near Hebron) with the aim of securely transporting people and goods between Gaza and the West Bank through Israeli territory as well as for transporting cargo to and from the Israeli port of Ashdod destined to the Palestinian Authority. Another proposed line would involve the revival of the old Hejaz railway branch from Afula to Jenin.

External links
Israel Railways
Jaffa-Jerusalem Rail Ticket Shapell Manuscript Foundation

References

 
Israel